The tits, chickadees, and titmice constitute the Paridae, a large family of small passerine birds which occur mainly in the Northern Hemisphere and Africa. Most were formerly classified in the genus Parus.

Members of this family are commonly referred to as "tits" throughout much of the English speaking world, but North American species are called either "chickadees" (onomatopoeic, derived from their distinctive "chick-a dee dee dee" alarm call) or "titmice". The name titmouse is recorded from the 14th century, composed of the Old English name for the bird, mase (Proto-Germanic *maison, Dutch mees, German Meise), and tit, denoting something small. The former spelling, "titmose", was influenced by mouse in the 16th century. Emigrants to New Zealand presumably identified some of the superficially similar birds of the genus Petroica of the family Petroicidae, the Australian robins, as members of the tit family, giving them the title tomtit, although, in fact, they are not related.

These birds are mainly small, stocky, woodland species with short, stout  bills. Some have crests. They are adaptable birds, with a mixed diet including seeds and insects. Many species live around human habitation and come readily to bird feeders for nuts or seed, and learn to take other foods.

Description
With the exception of the three monotypic genera Sylviparus, Melanochlora, and Pseudopodoces, the tits are extremely similar in appearance, and have been described as "one of the most conservative avian families in terms of general morphology". The majority of the variation within the family is in plumage, and particularly colour.

The bills of the tits are generally short, varying between stout and fine, depending on diet. The more insectivorous species have finer bills, whereas those that consume more seeds have stouter bills. It is said that tits are evolving longer beaks to reach into bird feeders. The most aberrant bill of the family is possessed by Hume's ground tit of Tibet and the Himalayas, which is long and decurved.

Distribution and habitat

The tits are a widespread family of birds, occurring over most of Europe, Asia, North America, and Africa. The genus Poecile occurs from Europe through Asia into North America, as far south as southern Mexico. American species in this genus are known as chickadees. Some species in this genus have quite large natural distributions; one, the grey-headed chickadee, is distributed from Scandinavia to Alaska and Canada. The majority of the tits in the genus Periparus are found in the southeastern portion of Asia. This includes two species endemic to the Philippines. The coal tit, also in this genus, is a much more widespread species, ranging from the British Isles and North Africa to Japan. The two crested tits of the genus Lophophanes have a disjunct distribution, with one species occurring in Europe and the other in central Asia.

The genus Baeolophus is endemic to North America. The genus Parus includes the great tit that ranges from Western Europe to Indonesia. Cyanistes has a European and Asian distribution (also into northern Africa), and the three remaining genera, Pseudopodoces, Sylviparus, and Melanochlora, are all restricted to Asia.

Behaviour
Tits are active, noisy, and social birds. They are territorial during the breeding season and often join mixed-species feeding flocks during the nonbreeding season. The tits are highly adaptable, and after the corvids (crows and jays) and parrots, amongst the most intelligent of all birds.

Fission–fusion society
Fission–fusion society has been documented in a number of avian taxa including this one. In brief, that means flocks can split into smaller groups or individuals, and subsequently reunite.

Vocalisations

The tits make a variety of calls and songs. They are amongst the most vocal of all birds, calling continuously in most situations, so much so that they are only ever silent for specific reasons such as avoiding predators or when intruding on a rival's territory. Quiet contact calls are made while feeding to facilitate cohesion with others in their social group. Other calls are used for signalling alarm—a well-known example being the "chic-a-dee-dee" of North American species in the genus Poecile, the call which gives them their local common name, the chickadee. The call also serves as a rallying call to summon others to mob and harass the predator. The number of "dee" syllables at the end of the call increases with the level of danger the predator poses.

Diet and feeding

The tits are generalist insectivores that consume a wide range of small insects and other invertebrates, particularly small defoliating caterpillars. They also consume seeds and nuts, particularly in the winter. One characteristic method of foraging in the family is hanging, where they  inspect a branch or twig and leaves from all angles while hanging upside down to feed. In areas where numerous species of tit coexist, different species forage in different parts of the tree, their niche determined in no small way by their morphology; larger species forage on the ground, medium-sized species foraging on larger branches, and the smallest species on the ends of branches. Having obtained larger prey items or seeds, tits  engage in hold-hammering, where they hold the item between their feet and hammer it with their bill until it opens. In this fashion, they can even open hazelnuts in around 20 minutes. A number of genera engage in food caching, hoarding supplies of food during the winter.

Breeding
Tits are cavity-nesting birds, typically using trees, although Pseudopodoces builds a nest on the ground. Most tree-nesting tits excavate their nests, and clutch sizes are generally large for altricial birds, ranging from usually two eggs in the rufous-vented tit of the Himalayas to as many as 10 to 14 in the blue tit of Europe. In favourable conditions, this species had laid as many as 19 eggs, which is the largest clutch of any altricial bird. Most tits are multibrooded, a necessary strategy to cope with either the harsh winters in which they reside in the Holarctic or the extremely erratic conditions of tropical Africa, where typically a single pair cannot find enough food to rear even one nestling and in drought years breeding is likely to be futile.

Many African tit species, along with Pseudopodoces, are cooperative breeders, and even pair-breeding parids are often highly social and maintain stable flocks throughout the nonbreeding season.

Tits also have a variety of methods for attracting mates, primarily through their intricate, bouncing mating dance. Only the blue tit is typically polygynous; all other species are generally monogamous. Courtship feeding is typical of pair-breeding tits to deal with the cost of rearing their large broods.

Systematics 

Recently, the large Parus group has been gradually split into several genera (as indicated below), initially by North American ornithological authorities and later elsewhere. Whereas in the mid-1990s, only Pseudopodoces, Baeolophus, Melanochlora, and Sylviparus were considered well-supported by the available data as distinct from Parus. Today, this arrangement is considered paraphyletic as indicated by mtDNA cytochrome b sequence analysis, and Parus is best restricted to the Parus major—Parus fasciiventer clade, and even the latter species' closest relatives might be considered a distinct genus.

In the Sibley-Ahlquist taxonomy, the family Paridae is much enlarged to include related groups such as the penduline tits and long-tailed tits, but while the former are quite close to the tits and could conceivably be included in that family together with the stenostirid "warblers", the long-tailed tits are not. Indeed, the yellow-browed tit and the sultan tit are possibly more distant to the tits than the penduline tits are. If the two current families are lumped into the Paridae, the tits would be a subfamily Parinae.

Alternatively, all tits—save the two monotypic genera discussed in the preceding section and possibly Cyanistes, but including Hume's ground tit—could be lumped in Parus. In any case, four major clades of "typical" tits can be recognized: the dark-capped chickadees and their relatives (Poecile including Sittiparus), the long-crested Baeolophus and Lophophanes species, the usually tufted, white-cheeked Periparus (including Pardaliparus) with more subdued coloration and finally Parus sensu stricto (including Melaniparus and Machlolophus). Still, the interrelationship of these, as well as the relationships of many species within the clades, are not well-resolved at all; analysis of morphology and biogeography probably gives a more  robust picture than the available molecular data.

Tits have settled North America twice, probably at some time during the Early-Mid Pliocene. The first were the ancestors of Baeolophus, with chickadees arriving somewhat later.

Species in taxonomic order

Family: PARIDAE

References

External links

Titmouse photos & videos on the Internet Bird Collection

Taxa named by Nicholas Aylward Vigors